Arakaki is an Okinawan surname. In Okinawan language, it pronounced Arakachi. It means New Stone Wall or “wild enclosure”, but actually denoting the enclosure around a Shintō shrine. Notable people with the surname include:

Ankichi Arakaki (1899–1927), Okinawan martial artist
Ernesto Arakaki (born 1979), Peruvian football defender of Japanese descent playing for Alianza Lima
Hisako Arakaki (born 1977), Ryukyuan J-pop singer from Okinawa, Japan
Hitoe Arakaki (born 1981), the oldest member of the J-pop group SPEED in Japan
Nagisa Arakaki (born 1980), professional baseball player in Japan's Nippon Professional Baseball
Seishō Arakaki (1840–1918), Okinawan martial artist
, Japanese footballer
Ryan Arakaki (born 1987), Sound Effects Editor for TV, Music and Film. Also NHL Zamboni driver.

Japanese-language surnames
Okinawan surnames